George Harry Bowering,  (born December 1, 1935) is a prolific Canadian novelist, poet, historian, and biographer. He was the first Canadian Parliamentary Poet Laureate.

He was born in Penticton, British Columbia, and raised in the nearby town of Oliver, where his father was a high-school chemistry teacher. Bowering is author of more than 100 books.

Bowering is the best-known of a group of young poets including Frank Davey, Fred Wah, Jamie Reid, and David Dawson who studied together at the University of British Columbia in the 1950s.  There they founded the journal TISH.  Bowering lives in Vancouver, British Columbia and is Professor Emeritus at Simon Fraser University, where he worked for 30 years. Never having written as an adherent of organized religion, he has in the past wryly described himself as a Baptist agnostic. In 2002, Bowering was appointed the first ever Canadian Parliamentary Poet Laureate. That same year, he was made an Officer of the Order of Canada. He was awarded the Order of British Columbia in 2004.

When the Indian Hungryalist, also known as Hungry generation, poet Malay Roy Choudhury, was arrested at Kolkata, India, Bowering brought out a special issue of Imago for helping the Indian poet in his trial.

Bowering was one of the judges for the 2008 Griffin Poetry Prize.

Bibliography

Novels
 1967: Mirror on the Floor, Toronto: McClelland & Stewart; Vancouver: Anvil Press, 2014
 1973: Fiddler's Night, Vancouver: Dos Equis
 1977: A Short Sad Book, Vancouver: Talonbooks; Vancouver: New Star Books, 2017
 1980: Burning Water, Toronto: Musson Book Company; Vancouver: New Star Books, 2007
 French edition: En eaux troubles, translated by L.-Philippe Hébert, Montreal: Quinze, 1982
 1988: Caprice, Toronto/New York: Penguin; Vancouver: New Star Books, 2010
 1990: Harry's Fragments, Vancouver: Talonbooks
 1994: Shoot!, Toronto: Key Porter Books; Vancouver: New Star Books, 2008
 1998: Piccolo Mondo (with Angela Bowering, Michael Matthews & David Bromige), Toronto: Couch House Books 
 2012: Pinboy, Toronto: Cormorant Books
 2015: Writing the Okanagan, Vancouver: Talonbooks
 2018: No One, Toronto: ECW Press

Short fiction
 1974: Flycatcher and Other Stories, Ottawa: Oberon Press
 1977: Concentric Circles, Windsor: Black Moss Press
 1978: Protective Footwear, Toronto: McClelland & Stewart
 1983: A Place to Die, Ottawa: Oberon Press
 1994: The Rain Barrel, Vancouver: Talonbooks
 2004: Standing on Richards, Toronto: Viking
 2009: The Box, Vancouver: New Star Books
 2015: Ten Women, Vancouver: Anvil Press

YA Fiction

 1994: Parents from Space, Montreal: Roussan
 1998: Diamondback Dog, Montreal: Roussan
 2015: Attack of the Toga Gang, Toronto: Dancing Cat Books

Booklength Poems

 1967: Baseball, Toronto: Coach House Books
 1970: George,Vancouver, Kitchener, Weed/Flower
 1971: Geneve, Toronto: Coach House Books
 1972: Autobiology, Vancouver: New Star Books, 1972; Vancouver, Pooka Press, 2006
 1972: Curious, Toronto: Coach House Books
 1974: At War With the U.S., Vancouver: Talonbooks
 1976: Allophanes, Toronto: Coach House Books
 1982: Ear Reach, Vancouver: Alcuin
 1984: Kerrisdale Elegies, Toronto: Coach House Books; Vancouver, Pooka Press, 2008; Vancouver: Talonbooks, 2008
Italian edition: Elegie di Kerrisdale, translated by Annalisa Goldoni, Rome: Edizioni Empiria, 1996
 2000: His Life: a poem, Toronto: ECW Press
 2010: My Darling Nellie Grey, Vancouver: Talonbooks
 2019: Taking Measures, Vancouver: Talonbooks

Collections of Poems (including gathered long poems)

 1963: Sticks & Stones, Vancouver: Tishbooks; Vancouver: Talonbooks, 1989
 1964: Points on the Grid, Toronto: Contact Press
 1965: The Man in Yellow Boots/ El hombre de las botas amarillas, Mexico: Ediciones El Corno
 1966: The Silver Wire, Kingston, Quarry Press
 1969: Rocky Mountain Foot, Toronto: McClelland & Stewart
 1969: The Gangs of Kosmos, Toronto: House of Anansi Press
 1971: Touch: selected poems 1960-1969, Toronto: McClelland & Stewart
 1974: In the Flesh, Toronto: McClelland & Stewart
 1976: The Catch, Toronto: McClelland & Stewart
 1976: Poem & Other Baseballs, Windsor: Black Moss Press
 1977: The Concrete Island, Montreal: Véhicule Press
 1979: Another Mouth, Toronto: McClelland & Stewart
 1981: Particular Accidents: selected poems, Vancouver: Talonbooks
 1982: West Window: selected poetry, Toronto: General
 1982: Smoking Mirror, Edmonton: Longspoon
 1985: Seventy-One Poems for People, Red Deer: RDC Press
 1986: Delayed Mercy & other poems, Toronto: Coach House Books
 1992: Urban Snow, Vancouver: Talonbooks
 1993: George Bowering Selected: Poems 1961-1992, Toronto: McClelland & Stewart
 1997: Blonds on Bikes, Vancouver: Talonbooks
 2004: Changing on the Fly, Vancouver, Polestar Press
 2006: Vermeer's Light: Poems 1996-2006, Vancouver, Talonbooks
 2013: Teeth: Poems 2006-2011, Toronto: Mansfield Press
 2015: The World, I Guess, Vancouver: New Star Books
 2018: Some End, Vancouver: New Star Books

Criticism

 1970: Al Purdy, Toronto: Copp Clark
 1971: Robert Duncan: an Interview, Toronto: Coach House/Beaver Kosmos
 1979: Three Vancouver Writers, Toronto: Open Letter/Coach House
 1982: A Way With Words, Ottawa: Oberon Press
 1983: The Mask in Place, Winnipeg: Turnstone Press
 1985: Craft Slices, Ottawa: Oberon Press
 1988: Errata, Red Deer: RDC Press
 1988: Imaginary Hand, Edmonton: NeWest Press
 2005: Left Hook, Vancouver: Raincoast Books
 2010: Horizontal Surfaces, Toronto: BookThug
 2012: Words, Words, Words, Vancouver: New Star Books
 2019: Writing and Reading, Vancouver: New Star Books

Chapbooks

 1967: How I Hear Howl, Montreal: Beaver Kosmos
 1969: Two Police Poems, Vancouver: Talonbooks
 1972: The Sensible, Toronto: Massasauga
 1973: Layers 1-13, Kitchener: Weed/Flower
 1977: In Answer, Vancouver: William Hoffer
 1980: Uncle Louis, Toronto: Coach House Books
 1985: Spencer & Groulx, Vancouver: William Hoffer
 1991: Quarters, Prince George: Gorse Press (Winner, bp Nichol chapbook award 1991)
 1992: Do Sink, Vancouver: Pomflit (Winner, bp Nichol chapbook award, 1992).
 1992: Sweetly, Vancouver: Wuz
 1997: Blondes on Bikes, Ottawa: Above Ground
 1998: A, You're Adorable, Ottawa: Above Ground
 2000: 6 Little Poems in Alphabetical Order, Calgary: House Press
 2001: Some Writers, Calgary: House Press
 2002: Joining the Lost Generation, Calgary: House Press
 2004: Lost in the Library, Ellsworth, ME: Backwoods Broadsides
 2005: Rewriting my Grandfather, Vancouver: Nomados
 2006: Crows in the Wind, Toronto: BookThug
 2006: A Knot of Light, Calgary: No Press
 2007: Montenegro 1966, Calgary: No Press
 2007: U.S. Sonnets, Vancouver: Pooka Press
 2007: Eggs in There, Edmonton: Rubicon
 2007: Some Answers, Mt. Pleasant, ON: LaurelReed Books
 2007: Horizontal Surfaces, Edmonton: Olive Collective
 2007: Tocking Heads, Edmonton: above/ground
 2008: There  Then, Prince George: Gorse Press
 2008: Animals, Beasts, Critters, Vancouver: JB Objects
 2008: Valley, Calgary: No Press
 2008: Fulgencio, Vancouver: Nomados
 2008: According to Brueghel, North Vancouver: Capilano
 2008: Shall I Compare, Penticton: Beaver Kosmos
 2009: A Little Black Strap, St. Paul: Unarmed
 2013: Los Pájaros de Tenacatita, Ootischenia: Nose-in-Book
 2016: Sitting in Jalisco, Ootischenia: Nose-in-Book
 2016: That Toddlin Town, Ottawa: above/ground books
 2019: David in Byzantium, Cobourg: Proper Tales Press

Memoirs

 1993: The Moustache: Memories of Greg Curnoe, Toronto: Coach House Books
 2001: A Magpie Life, Toronto: Key Porter
 2002: Cars, Toronto: Coach House Books
 2006: Baseball Love, Vancouver: Talonbooks
 2011: How I Wrote Certain of my Books, Toronto: Mansfield Press
 2016: The Hockey Scribbler, Toronto: ECW Press
 2016: The Dad Dialogues (with Charles Demers), Vancouver: Arsenal Pulp Press

History
 1996: Bowering's B.C., Toronto: Viking
 1999:  Also published in 2000 by Penguin. . .
 2003: Stone Country, Toronto: Viking

Plays

 1962: "The Home for Heroes", Vancouver: Prism
 1966: "What Does Eddie Williams Want?", Montreal: CBC-TV
 1972: "George Vancouver", Vancouver: CBC radio network
 1973: "Sitting in Mexico", Vancouver: CBC radio network
 1986: "Music in the Park", Vancouver: CBC radio network
 1989: "The Great Grandchildren of Bill Bissett's Mice", Vancouver: CBC radio network

Editions

 The 1962 Poems of R.S. Lane, Toronto: Ganglia Press, 1965
 Vibrations: poems of youth, Toronto, Gage, 1970
 The Story so Far, Toronto, Coach House, 1972
 The City in her Eyes by David Cull, Vancouver: Vancouver Community Press, 1972
 Imago Twenty, Vancouver, Talonbooks, 1974
 Cityflowers by Artie Gold, Montreal: Delta Canada, 1974
 Letters from Geeksville: letters from Red Lane 1960-64, Prince George: Caledonia Writing Series, 1976
 Great Canadian Sports Stories, Ottawa: Oberon Press, 1979
 Fiction of Contemporary Canada, Toronto: Coach House Books, 1980
 Loki is Buried at Smoky Creek: selected poems of Fred Wah, Vancouver: Talonbooks, 1981
 My Body was Eaten by Dogs: selected poems of David McFadden, Toronto: McClelland & Stewart, New York: CrossCountry, 1981
 "1945-1980," in Introduction to Poetry: British, American, Canadian, David and Lecker, Toronto: Holt, Rinehart, and Winston, 1981
 The Contemporary Canadian Poem Anthology, Toronto: Coach House Books, 1983
 Sheila Watson and The Double Hook: the artist and her critics, Ottawa: Golden Dog Press, 1984
 Taking the Field:the best of baseball fiction, Red Deer: RDC Press, 1990
 Likely Stories: a postmodern sampler (with Linda Hutcheon), Toronto: Coach House Books, 1992
 An H in the Heart: Selected works of bpNichol (with Michael Ondaatje), Toronto: McClelland & Stewart, 1994
 And Other Stories, Vancouver: Talonbooks, 2001
 The 2008 Griffin Poetry Prize Anthology, Toronto: House of Anansi, 2008
 The Heart Does Break (with Jean Baird), Toronto: Random House, 2009

Editor

 Tish, Vancouver, 1961–63
 Imago, Calgary, London, Montreal, Vancouver, 1964-1974
 Beaver Kosmos Folios, Calgary, London, Montreal, Vancouver, 1966–75.

About

 A Record of Writing: an annotated and Illustrated Bibliography of George Bowering by Roy Miki, Vancouver: Talonbooks, 1989
 Essays on Canadian Writing, George Bowering issue ed. Ken Norris, 1989
 George Bowering: Bright Circles of Colour by Eva-Marie Kroller, Vancouver: Talonbooks, 1992
 George Bowering and His Works by John Harris, Toronto: ECW Press, 1992
 71 (+) for GB ed. Jean Baird, David McFadden and George Stanley, Vancouver/Toronto: (printed at) Coach House Books, 2005
 He Speaks Volumes: A Biography of George Bowering by Rebecca Wigod, Vancouver: Talonbooks, 2018

External links 
Author's website
George Bowering at the Parliament of Canada website 
George Bowering's entry in The Canadian Encyclopedia
Griffin Poetry Prize biography
Griffin Poetry Prize reading, including video clip
The Holy Life of the Intellect link provides transcription & audio for an essay Bowering first read on National Public Radio (NPR) "Weekend Edition" on August 19, 2007
Canadian Poetry Online: George Bowering  - Biography and 6 poems (Van. Can., Hillside Sun, Musing on Some Poets, Wolf Between the Trees, There is, How Odd Men Are Really)
Judith Fitzgerald and George Bowering in an Excellent Conversation on Poetry & Poetics 
Archives of George Bowering (George Bowering fonds, R11712) are held at Library and Archives Canada

1935 births
Living people
Canadian agnostics
Canadian male novelists
20th-century Canadian poets
20th-century Canadian male writers
Canadian male poets
21st-century Canadian poets
20th-century Canadian historians
Historians of Canada
Members of the Order of British Columbia
Officers of the Order of Canada
Academic staff of Simon Fraser University
People from Penticton
Writers from British Columbia
Canadian Parliamentary Poets Laureate
Governor General's Award-winning fiction writers
Governor General's Award-winning poets
University of British Columbia alumni
20th-century Canadian novelists
21st-century Canadian novelists
21st-century Canadian male writers
Canadian male non-fiction writers